Manchester Village may refer to:

Manchester Village Historic District (Manchester, Massachusetts), historic area in United States
Manchester Village Historic District (Manchester, Vermont), historic area in United States
Manchester Village Spartans RUFC, English gay rugby union team
Manchester (village), Vermont, village within town of Manchester, Vermont, United States
Manchester (village), New York, village within town of Manchester, New York, United States

See also
Manchester gay village, area of Manchester, England